Wilfred Oliver "Coach" Tull (born 5 October 1916 in Brasso, Trinidad and Tobago, died January 2003 in Albuquerque, New Mexico, U.S.) was a Track and field athlete from Trinidad and Tobago, a representative in the United Nations and a long-time coach for professional and amateur athletes.

He was a member of the Trinidad and Tobago team at the 1948 Summer Olympics in London. He competed in both the men's 800 meters and 1500 meters and was the first athlete to represent his country in these games.

After his professional athletic career, Coach spent 20 years working with the United Nations. While living in NY, Coach was a founding member of the renowned New York Road Runners Club, along with future Hollywood Actor Roscoe Lee Brown.

After retiring from the UN, Coach moved to Albuquerque with his wife and family in 1976. Though retired, Coach spent the majority of his time devoted to local athletes.

External links
 sports-reference

1916 births
2003 deaths
Trinidad and Tobago male middle-distance runners
Trinidad and Tobago male sprinters
Athletes (track and field) at the 1948 Summer Olympics
Athletes (track and field) at the 1951 Pan American Games
Olympic athletes of Trinidad and Tobago
Central American and Caribbean Games medalists in athletics
Pan American Games competitors for Trinidad and Tobago
Trinidad and Tobago expatriates in the United States